Petros Kyritsis (born 15 October 1953) is a Cypriot sports shooter. He competed in the mixed skeet event at the 1984 Summer Olympics.

References

1953 births
Living people
Cypriot male sport shooters
Olympic shooters of Cyprus
Shooters at the 1984 Summer Olympics
Place of birth missing (living people)